Celastrina ladonides, the silvery hedge blue, is a small butterfly found in India that belongs to the lycaenids or blues family.

Taxonomy
The butterfly was earlier known as Lycaenopsis ladonides Hemmings.

Range
It is found from Murree in Pakistan to Kumaon in India.

See also
List of butterflies of India
List of butterflies of India (Lycaenidae)

References

 
 

Celastrina
Fauna of Pakistan
Butterflies of Asia
Butterflies described in 1869